The Moccasin Game is a gambling game once played by most Native American tribes in North America. In the game, one player hides an object (traditionally a pebble, but more recently sometimes an old bullet or a ball) in one of several moccasins, but in such a way that the other player cannot easily see which moccasin it is in; that player then has to guess which  moccasin contains the object. Customarily, the game would be accompanied by music played on drums to distract the guessing player.

In Dakota, the moccasin game is called haƞpap̣ena or "haƞpap̣ec̣uƞpi."

The game's popularity faded over time, and the old songs were forgotten.  By the 1960s only the Chippewa (Ojibwe) of Minnesota and a few other groups still played it.
However, in recent years, like many other traditional games (such as lacrosse), moccasin game has seen a resurgence of interest among younger generations. Tournaments are often held during the summer at powwows or other gatherings and are sponsored by a tribe, organization, or family.

See also
 Shell game

References

External links
 Daily Life in Olden Times for Kids - Woodland Ojibwa (Chippewa) Indians - The Moccasin Game
 PBS: River of Song - Moccasin Game Songs

Native American culture
Gambling games